Momin High School a Government Sponsored co-educational Urdu-medium school in Kolkata, affiliated to the West Bengal Board of Secondary Education and West Bengal Council of Higher Secondary Education.

History
It was founded on 23 July 1945 by the Momin Education Board to improve the educational opportunities of the minority community. Haji Abdur Raheem donated land for the school.

About School
The school has classes for girls in the mornings and for boys during the daytime.

Md. Shahid Aslam has been the principal of the school since March 2006.

See also
Education in India
List of schools in India
Education in West Bengal

High schools and secondary schools in Kolkata
Educational institutions established in 1945
1945 establishments in India